Shahrestaneh or Shahristaneh may refer to:
Shahrestaneh, Hamadan
Shahrestaneh, Razavi Khorasan
Shahrestaneh Rural District, in Razavi Khorasan Province